Magnolia is the fifth studio album by American country music singer Randy Houser. It was released on January 11, 2019 via Broken Bow Records' Stoney Creek imprint. The album includes the single "What Whiskey Does", a duet with Hillary Lindsey.

Content
Magnolia was originally slated for release on November 2, 2018, but Houser chose to postpone the album's release. The lead single, "What Whiskey Does", features Hillary Lindsey.

Houser produced the album with singer-songwriter Keith Gattis. Of its content, he told Taste of Country that "When writing for this new project, I knew the production had to lean on songs and melodies, not a bunch of tricks and loops. That was the catalyst for the album. So, for the past two years we’ve been focused on trying to find a unique sound and trying to best serve the songs."

Commercial performance
The album debuted at No. 11 on Billboards Country Albums chart.  It has sold 12,000 copies in the United States as of January 2022.

Track listing

Personnel
Adapted from liner notes.

Jessi Alexander - background vocals
Dan Baird - electric guitar
Matt Chamberlain - drums, percussion
Fred Eltringham - drums, percussion
Paul Franklin - pedal steel guitar
Audley Freed - acoustic guitar, electric guitar
Keith Gattis - banjo, bass guitar, acoustic guitar, baritone guitar, electric guitar, harmonica, mandolin, percussion, programming, background vocals
Lee Hendricks - bass guitar
David Henry - strings
Randy Houser - acoustic guitar, electric guitar, lead vocals, background vocals
Rami Jaffee - Hammond B-3 organ, keyboards
Randy Kohrs - dobro
Hillary Lindsey - background vocals on "What Whiskey Does"
Gale Mayes - background vocals
Billy Mercer - bass guitar
Kevin Murphy - drums
John Osborne - electric guitar, background vocals
T.J. Osborne - background vocals
Lucie Silvas - background vocals on "Our Hearts"
John Henry Trinko - accordion, Fender Rhodes, Hammond B-3 organ, piano, toy piano, Wurlitzer
Robby Turner - pedal steel guitar
Craig Wright - drums

Charts

References

2019 albums
BBR Music Group albums
Randy Houser albums